York City Football Club is a professional association football club based in York, North Yorkshire, England. Formed in May 1922, the club failed to be elected to the Football League for the 1922–23 season, but succeeded in gaining admission to the Midland League. After seven seasons of competing in the Midland League, the club was elected to play in the Football League ahead of 1929–30. After 75 years of Football League membership, York were relegated to the Football Conference in 2004. This is where the club remained for eight years before promotion back to the Football League was achieved with victory in the 2012 Conference Premier play-off Final. However, York were relegated to the National League four years later.

The club's first team have competed in numerous competitions, and all players who have played between 1 and 24 first-team matches, either as a member of the starting eleven or as a substitute, are listed below. Each player's details include the duration of his York career, his typical playing position while with the club, and the number of matches played and goals scored in domestic league matches and in all senior competitive matches. Where applicable, the list also includes the national team for which the player was selected, and the number of senior international caps he won.

Introduction
As of the date specified above, more than 500 players had completed their York career before reaching the 25-match milestone. Many of these players spent only a short period of their careers at York before seeking opportunities in other teams. Players who have gone on to experience football in the English top tier include Chris Iwelumo, when playing for Wolverhampton Wanderers, and Neil Warnock, when managing Notts County, Sheffield United, Queens Park Rangers and Crystal Palace. At international level, Iwelumo went on to represent Scotland and Leo Bertos became the first former York player to represent his country at a FIFA World Cup when appearing for New Zealand at the 2010 tournament. Four players with under 25 appearances went on to manage the club; these were Jock Collier, Tom Mitchell, Viv Busby and Steve Torpey.

Many players spent brief periods with York on loan from other clubs. Some were young players gaining experience; Mike Stowell went on to play more than 400 matches for Wolverhampton Wanderers and Mike Cook played for the Cambridge United team that won promotion in the 1990 Fourth Division play-offs. Other loanees had an established career but were not needed by their owning club; Steve Davis scored on his debut for York, while Courtney Pitt came on as a substitute in the 2010 Conference Premier play-off Final.

As of the date above, 12 players have left the club with 24 career appearances; Bobby Warrender, Fred Marlow, Brad Halliday, Bradley Fewster, Tom Mitchell, John Hammerton, Liam George, Jamie Price, Nick Pope, Richard Tindale, Phil Taylor and Byron Webster. The list includes 12 players who are still contracted to the club, and so can add to their totals.

Key
The list is ordered first by number of appearances in total, then by number of league appearances, and then if necessary by date of debut.
Appearances as a substitute are included.
Statistics are correct up to and including the match played on 18 March 2023. Where a player left the club permanently after this date, his statistics are updated to his date of leaving.

Players with fewer than 25 appearances

Players with 25 or more appearances

Notes

Player statistics include matches played while on loan from:

References
General

Specific

Players
 
York City
York City F.C. players (fewer than 25 appearances)
Association football player non-biographical articles